Petrophile media is a species of flowering plant in the family Proteaceae and is endemic to southwestern Western Australia. It is a low, spreading to erect shrub with needle-shaped leaves, and oval heads of hairy cream-coloured to yellow flowers.

Description

Taxonomy
Petrophile media was first formally described in 1830 by Robert Brown in the Supplementum to his Prodromus Florae Novae Hollandiae et Insulae Van Diemen from material collected by William Baxter near King Georges Sound in 1829. The specific epithet (media) means "middle" , "common" or "intermediate between other species".

Distribution and habitat
Petrophile media grows in a variety of habitats on the Darling Range south of Perth and on the coastal plain to the Stirling Range and eastwards to near Ravensthorpe in the Avon Wheatbelt, Esperance Plains, Jarrah Forest and Mallee biogeographic regions.

Conservation status
This petrophile is classified as "not threatened" by the Western Australian Government Department of Parks and Wildlife.

References

media
Eudicots of Western Australia
Endemic flora of Western Australia
Plants described in 1830
Taxa named by Robert Brown (botanist, born 1773)